The Palm-Wine Drinkard (subtitled "and His Dead Palm-Wine Tapster in the Dead's Town") is a novel published in 1952 by the Nigerian author Amos Tutuola. The first African novel published in English outside of Africa, this quest tale based on Yoruba folktales is written in a modified English or Pidgin English. In it, a man follows his brewer into the land of the dead, encountering many spirits and adventures. The novel has always been controversial, inspiring both admiration and contempt among Western and Nigerian critics, but has emerged as one of the most important texts in the African literary canon, translated into more than a dozen languages.

Plot
The Palm-Wine Drinkard, told in the first person, is about an unnamed man who is addicted to palm wine, which is made from the fermented sap of the palm tree and used in ceremonies all over West Africa. The son of a rich man, the narrator can afford his own tapster (a man who taps the palm tree for sap and then prepares the wine). When the tapster dies, cutting off his supply, the desperate narrator sets off for Dead's Town to try to bring the tapster back. He travels through a world of magic and supernatural beings, surviving various tests and finally gains a magic egg with never-ending palm wine.

Criticism
The Palm-Wine Drinkard was widely reviewed in Western publications when it was published by Faber and Faber. In 1975, the Africanist literary critic Bernth Lindfors produced an anthology of all the reviews of Tutuola's work published to date. The first review was an enthusiastic one from Dylan Thomas, who felt it was "simply and carefully described" in "young English"; his lyrical 500-word review drew attention to Tutuola's work and set the tone for succeeding criticism.

The early reviewers after Thomas described the book as "primitive", "primeval", "naïve", "un-willed",  "lazy", and "barbaric" or "barbarous". The New York Times Book Review was typical in describing Tutuola as "a true primitive" whose world had "no connection at all with the European rational and Christian traditions," adding that Tutuola was "not a revolutionist of the word, …not a surrealist" but an author with an "un-willed style" whose text had "nothing to do with the author's intentions". The New Yorker took this criticism to its logical ends, stating that Tutuola was "being taken a great deal too seriously" as he is just a "natural storyteller" with a "lack of inhibition" and an "uncorrupted innocence" whose text was not new to anyone who had been raised on "old-fashioned nursery literature". The reviewer concluded that American authors should not imitate Tutuola, as "it would be fatal for a writer with a richer literary inheritance". In The Spectator, Kingsley Amis called the book an "unfathomable African myth" but credited it with a "unique grotesque humour" that is a "severe test" for the reader.

Given these Western reviews, it is not surprising that African intellectuals of the time saw the book as bad for Africa, believing that the story showed Nigerians as illiterate and superstitious drunks. They worried that the novel confirmed Europeans' racist "fantastic" concepts of Africa, "a continent of which they are profoundly ignorant". Some criticized the novel as unoriginal, labeling it as little more than a retelling of Yoruba tales heard in the village square and Tutuola as "merely" a story teller who embellished stories for a given audience. Some insisted that Tutuola's "strange lingo" was related to neither Yoruba nor West African Pidgin English.

It was only later that the novel began to rise in the general estimation. Critics began to value Tutuola's literary style as a unique exploration of the possibilities of African folklore instead of the more typical realist imitation of European novels in African novels. One of the contributions Tutuola made was to "kill forever any idea that Africans are copyists of the cultures of other races". Tutuola was seen as a "pioneer of a new literary form, based on an ancient verbal style". Rather than seeing the book as mere pastiche, critics began to note that Tutuola had done a great deal "to impose an extraordinary unity upon his apparently random collection of traditional material" and that what may have started as "fragments of folklore, ritual and belief" had "all passed through the transmuting fire of an individual imagination".  The Nigerian critic E. N. Obiechina argued that the narrator's "cosmopolitanism" enables him "to move freely through the rigidly partitioned world of the traditional folk-tale". In contrast to the works of an author like Kafka, he added, in which human beings are the impotent victims of inexorable fate, the narrator of The Palm Wine Drinkard "is the proud possessor of great magical powers with which he defies even Fate itself". The lack of resolution in the novel was also seen as more authentic, meant to enable group discussion in the same way that African riddles, proverbs and folktales did. Tutuola was no more ungrammatical than James Joyce or Mark Twain, whose use of dialect was more violent, others argued. The Nigerian novelist Chinua Achebe also defended Tutuola's work, stating that it could be read as a moral commentary on Western consumerism.

Well aware of the criticism, Tutuola has stated that he had no regrets, "Probably if I had more education, that might change my writing or improve it or change it to another thing people would not admire. Well, I cannot say. Perhaps with higher education, I might not be as popular a writer. I might not write folktales. I might not take it as anything important. I would take it as superstition and not write in that line". He also added "I wrote The Palm-Wine Drinkard for the people of the other countries to read the Yoruba folklores. ... My purpose of writing is to make other people to understand more about Yoruba people and in fact they have already understood more than ever before".

Legacy 
The Palm-Wine Drinkard was included on the "Big Jubilee Read" list of 70 books selected by a panel of experts, and announced by the BBC and The Reading Agency in April 2022, to celebrate Queen Elizabeth II's platinum jubilee in June 2022.

References

Works cited

External links
 
 Michael Swanwick discussing the book and Tutuola

1952 Nigerian novels
1952 debut novels
Faber and Faber books
Nigerian English-language novels
Nigerian fantasy novels
Nigerian magic realism novels
Novels set in Nigeria